Javanmardabad (also Romanized as Javānmardābād; also known as Javān Mīrābād and Jawānmīrābād) is a village in Sis Rural District, Bolbanabad District, Dehgolan County, Kurdistan Province, Iran. At the 2006 census, its population was 258, in 57 families. The village is populated by Kurds.

References 

Towns and villages in Dehgolan County
Kurdish settlements in Kurdistan Province